Laura Correia (born 29 November 1995) is a Luxembourgish tennis player.

Correia represents Luxembourg in Fed Cup.

References

External links
 
 
 

1995 births
Living people
Luxembourgian female tennis players
Sportspeople from Luxembourg City